Gabriel Adams (1790 – June 4, 1864) served as Mayor of Pittsburgh from 1847 to 1849.

Adams's administration witnessed the founding of the Joseph Horne Company, the founding of Mercy Hospital, and the beginnings of Organized Labor.

Mayor Adams would later serve as an appointed Judge of the Court of Common Pleas. He died in Lower St. Clair Township.

Gabriel also had 18 children 12 boys and 6 Girls. Their names were not recorded due to the fact that they all were born without the assistance of doctor or hospital. Also 13 of the children were born in France. Gabriel Adams is buried in Section 25, Lot 117 of Allegheny Cemetery, alongside his wife, Mary. Mary died in labor of child number 18.

See also

List of Mayors of Pittsburgh

Sources
South Pittsburgh Development Corporation
Political Graveyard

1790 births
1864 deaths
Mayors of Pittsburgh
Burials at Allegheny Cemetery
19th-century American politicians